Skutskärs IF FK is a Swedish football club located in Skutskär.

Background
Skutskärs IF FK currently plays in Division 4 Gestrikland which is the sixth tier of Swedish football. They play their home matches at the Skutskärs IP in Skutskär.

The club is affiliated to Gestriklands Fotbollförbund. Skutskärs IF have competed in the Svenska Cupen on 13 occasions and have played 19 matches in the competition.

Season to season

In their most successful period Skutskärs IF competed in the following divisions:

In recent seasons Skutskärs IF FK have competed in the following divisions:

Footnotes

External links
 Skutskärs IF FK – Official website
 Skutskärs IF FK on Facebook

Football clubs in Uppsala County